"Every Time I Get Around You" is a song written and recorded by American country music artist David Lee Murphy. It was released in March 1996 as the first single for his album Gettin' Out the Good Stuff. The song peaked at number 2 on both the U.S. and Canadian country charts. In Canada, the song was the Number One country song of the year on the RPM country singles charts.

Chart positions
"Every Time I Get Around You" debuted at number 63 on the U.S. Billboard Hot Country Singles & Tracks for the week of March 23, 1996.

Year-end charts

References

1996 singles
1996 songs
David Lee Murphy songs
Songs written by David Lee Murphy
Song recordings produced by Tony Brown (record producer)
RPM Country Tracks number-one singles of the year
MCA Records singles